Canela Airport , is the airport serving Canela and Gramado, Brazil.

Airlines and destinations

Access

See also

List of airports in Brazil

References

External links

Airports in Rio Grande do Sul